Harpalus atratus is a species of ground beetle in the subfamily Harpalinae. It was described by Latrellie in 1804.

References

atratus
Beetles described in 1804